A picada (from , "to nibble at") is a typical Argentine dish usually served as a starter, although sometimes as a main course. Related to the Italian antipasto and the Spanish tapas brought by massive immigration, it consists of a serving of savory snack and finger foods. A characteristic picada includes cheeses, cured meats, fermented sausages, olives and peanuts. One of the most popular dishes in Argentine cuisine, picadas are a social event that involves gathering with family or friends.

History

The origin of the picada is controversial. It is considered a culinary heritage of the massive Spanish and Italian immigration to the country, introducing the tradition of tapas and antipasto, respectively. 

Some consider the picada to be the successor to the previous concept of "copetín". In 1940s Buenos Aires' restaurants, a copetín was a tapas-inspired started served in a metal "triolet" plate, that included olives, potato chips, peanuts and palitos salados (flour-based snack sticks).

Although it was traditionally served as a starter, in recent years the picada has gained popularity as a main dish.

See also
 Argentine cuisine
 List of hors d'oeuvre

References

External links

 
Argentine cuisine
Appetizers